Sheila Dabney is an American actress, best known for her co-starring role in the 1987 lesbian feminist film She Must Be Seeing Things alongside Lois Weaver and directed by Sheila McLaughlin.

In 1984, Dabney won an Obie Award for her performance as Sarita in Maria Irene Fornés' play Sarita.

Theater 
 Performer, The Bacchae (1980) at Circle in the Square Theatre 
 Performer, The Three Travels of Aladdin With the Magic Lamp (1982) at La MaMa Experimental Theatre Club
 Performer, Hot Lunch Apostles (1983) at La MaMa Experimental Theatre Club 
 Performer, Conjur Woman (1983) at La MaMa Experimental Theatre Club 
 Performer, Jerusalem (1983), a work-in-progress, at La MaMa Experimental Theatre Club 
 Performer, Sarita (1984), produced by INTAR Theatre 
 Performer, Hot Lunch Apostles (1984) at La MaMa Experimental Theatre Club 
 Performer, Pedro Paramo (1984) at La MaMa Experimental Theatre Club 
 Performer, Harm's Way (1985) at La MaMa Experimental Theatre Club
 Performer, Big Mouth (1985) at La MaMa Experimental Theatre Club
 Performer, Cotton Club Gala (1985) at La MaMa Experimental Theatre Club
 Performer, Fragments of a Greek Trilogy (1987) at La MaMa Experimental Theatre Club
 Performer and musical composition and direction, Mythos Oedipus and Dionysus Filius Dei (1989) at La MaMa Experimental Theatre Club
 Performer and additional music and arrangements, Tancredi and Erminia (1993) at La MaMa Experimental Theatre Club
 Performer, Conjur Woman (2008) at La MaMa Experimental Theatre Club
 Musical director and performer, Red Noir (2009) at the Living Theatre

Filmography
 She Must Be Seeing Things (1987) as Agatha
 Rage of Angels (1983 TV film based on the novel by Sidney Sheldon) as Sharon
 Alice at the Palace (1982 TV film)
 The Underground Man (1974 TV film) as Rent-A-Car Girl

References

External links
 
 Dabney's page on La MaMa Archives Digital Collections

Living people
American film actresses
20th-century American actresses
African-American actresses
Obie Award recipients
Year of birth missing (living people)
20th-century African-American women
20th-century African-American people
21st-century African-American people
21st-century African-American women